This is a chronological list of World Trade Organization dispute settlement cases. , there have been 507 such cases.

List

References

Lists of lawsuits